Neotama mexicana, also known as the long-spinneret spider or Mexican two-tailed spider, is a species of tree trunk spider in the family Hersiliidae. It is found in a range from the United States to Peru and Guyana.

References

Hersiliidae
Articles created by Qbugbot
Spiders described in 1893